The Bowen Falls, also known as Lady Bowen Falls, is a popular tourist attraction at Milford Sound, a fiord in New Zealand.

The river and waterfalls were named for Diamantina Bowen (Lady Bowen), the wife of the fifth governor of New Zealand, George Bowen. The governor visited Milford Sound aboard  in 1871 and Bowen Falls was named to mark the occasion.

The track from the Milford Sound wharf to Bowen Falls closed in 2002 after a rock face had become unstable. The waterfall was inaccessible for 15 years and could only be visited by boat. On 29 January 2018, a short on-demand boat service ( long) was initiated that overcomes the unstable section. The round trip from Milford Sound wharf to Bowen Falls takes half an hour including the two boat trips.

References

Waterfalls of Fiordland
Tourist attractions in Southland, New Zealand